In chemistry, a sulfenic acid is an organosulfur compound and oxoacid with the general formula . It is the first member of the family of organosulfur oxoacids, which also include sulfinic acids and sulfonic acids, respectively. The base member of the sulfenic acid series with R = H is hydrogen thioperoxide.

Properties
In contrast to sulfinic and sulfonic acids, simple sulfenic acids, such as methanesulfenic acid, CH3SOH, are highly reactive and cannot be isolated in solution. In the gas phase the lifetime of methanesulfenic acid is about one minute. The gas phase structure of methanesulfenic acid was found by microwave spectroscopy (rotational spectroscopy) to be CH3–S–O–H. Sulfenic acids can be stabilized through steric effects, which prevent the sulfenic acid from condensing with itself to form thiosulfinates, RS(O)SR, such as allicin from garlic. Through the use of X-ray crystallography, the structure of such stabilized sulfenic acids were shown to be R–S–O–H. The stable, sterically hindered sulfenic acid 1-triptycenesulfenic acid has been found to have a pKa of 12.5 and an O–H bond-dissociation energy (bde) of 71.9 ± 0.3 kcal/mol, which can be compared to a pKa of ≥14 and O–H BDE of ~88 kcal/mol for the (valence) isoelectronic hydroperoxides, ROOH.

Formation and occurrence

Peroxiredoxins
Peroxiredoxins are ubiquitous and abundant enzymes that detoxify peroxides. They function by the conversion of a cysteine residue to a sulfenic acid.  The sulfenic acid then converts to a disulfide by reaction with another residue of cysteine.

Garlic and onions
Sulfenic acids are produced by the enzymatic decomposition of alliin and related compounds following tissue damage to garlic, onions, and other plants of the genus Allium. 1-Propenesulfenic acid, formed when onions are cut, is rapidly rearranged by a second enzyme, the lachrymatory factor synthase, giving syn-propanethial-S-oxide. 2-Propenesulfenic acid, formed from allicin, is thought to be responsible for garlic’s potent antioxidant activity. Mass spectrometry with a DART ion source were used to identify 2-propenesulfenic formed when garlic is cut or crushed and to demonstrate that this sulfenic acid has a lifetime of less than one second. The pharmacological activity of certain drugs, such as omeprazole, esomeprazole, ticlopidine, clopidogrel, and prasugrel is proposed to involve sulfenic acid intermediates. Oxidation of cysteine residues in protein to the corresponding protein sulfenic acids is suggested to be important in redox-mediated signal transduction.

Sulfenic acid forms part of the series of chemical reactions that occur when cutting onions. The lachrymal glands are irritated by the end product of the reactions, syn-Propanethial-S-oxide, causing tears.

Organic and inorganic chemistry

Sulfoxides can undergo thermal elimination via an Ei mechanism to yield vinyl alkenes and sulfenic acids:
R-S(O)CH2CH2-R' -> R-SOH + CH2=CH-R'

Compounds which react in this manner are used as polymer stabilizers where they protects against long term heat ageing, structures based on thiodipropionate esters are popular.

Sulfenate-based ligands are found at the active site of the nitrile hydratases.  The  group is proposed as the nucleophile that attacks the nitrile.

Other sulfenyl compounds

The prefix sulfenyl in organic nomenclature denotes the RS group (R ≠ H). One example is methanesulfenyl chloride, CH3SCl.  

Sulfenate esters have the formula RSOR′. They arise by the reaction of sulfenyl chlorides on alcohols. Sulfenate esters are intermediates in the Mislow-Evans rearrangement of allyl sulfoxides. Sulfenamides have the formula RSNR′2.

References

Organosulfur compounds